Highway 91 is an east-west highway in northern Israel and the Golan Heights. It extends through the Jordan Rift Valley and the central Golan Heights. It begins in the west at Mahanayim junction with Highway 90, and it ends in the east at Zivan junction near the Israeli settlement Ein Zivan, where it meets Highway 98. The road is 28 km long.

Junctions & Interchanges on the highway

Places of interest near Highway 91
 Memorial for Mishmar HaYarden
 Bnot Ya'akov Bridge
 Chief customs office (?)
 Memorial for the IDF 188th brigade

See also
List of highways in Israel

Roads in Israel
Roads in Israeli-occupied territories